Dragan Godžić (14 April 1927 – 23 June 1988) was a Serbian basketball player and coach. He represented the Yugoslavia national basketball team internationally.

Godžić was a member of the first managing board of the Crvena zvezda basketball club.

Playing career 
Godžić played for a Belgrade-based team Crvena zvezda of the Yugoslav First League. During the time with Crvena zvezda he won seven Yugoslav Championships.

National team career 
Godžić was a member of the Yugoslavia national basketball team that participated at the 1953 European Championship in Moscow, the Soviet Union. Over two tournament games, he averaged two points per game. He was a member of the team at the 1954 FIBA World Championship in Rio de Janeiro, Brazil. Over five tournament games, he averaged 6.8 points per game.

Career achievements and awards 
 Yugoslav League champion: 7 (with Crvena zvezda: 1947, 1948, 1951, 1952, 1953, 1954, 1955).

References

1927 births
1988 deaths
KK Crvena zvezda players
KK Železničar Beograd players
KK Crvena Zvezda executives
OKK Beograd players
Serbian men's basketball coaches
Serbian men's basketball players
Yugoslav basketball coaches
Yugoslav men's basketball players
ŽKK Crvena zvezda coaches
1954 FIBA World Championship players
Basketball players from Belgrade